The Union Gospel Mission is a charitable organization providing meals, education, shelter, safe and affordable housing, drug and alcohol recovery programs, and support services to those struggling with homelessness and addiction in Canada, with locations in the Metro Vancouver area and the city of Mission.

History
In 1940, 21-year-old Gordon (Bob) Stacey returned from working with the Jerry McAuley Cremorne Rescue Mission in New York City. At this time, the city of Vancouver had attracted many Canadians suffering from the Great Depression. Stacey established the Union Gospel Mission in 1940 at 10 Powell Street, in the heart of Vancouver’s historic Gastown.

In April 2011, UGM officially opened a new headquarters at 601 East Hastings in Vancouver, marking the largest expansion in its history. The new facility is 70,000 square feet and equipped to provide 72 shelter beds, 37 affordable housing units, extended meal capacity and a live-in drug and alcohol recovery program.

Programs
UGM focuses its support in five main areas:
Provision of basic necessities and practical assistance
Recovery programs from addictive lifestyles
Educational and job readiness programs
Outreach programs
Affordable housing through Union Gospel Housing Societies

See also
Downtown Eastside
History of Vancouver
Timeline of Vancouver history

References

External links
 Union Gospel Mission

Charities based in Canada
Downtown Eastside
City and Gospel Rescue Missions